Rodney Dent (born December 25, 1970) is an American former professional basketball player.  Born in Edison, Georgia, Dent played college basketball at the University of Kentucky. He was drafted by the Orlando Magic in the 1994 NBA draft. He was selected by the Vancouver Grizzlies in the 1995 NBA expansion draft in exchange for a second-round draft pick.

References

External links
Profile at bigbluehistory.net

1970 births
Living people
Basketball players from Georgia (U.S. state)
Centers (basketball)
Greek Basket League players
Kentucky Wildcats men's basketball players
Odessa Wranglers men's basketball players
Orlando Magic draft picks
People from Calhoun County, Georgia
Vancouver Grizzlies expansion draft picks
American men's basketball players
American expatriate basketball people in Taiwan